Anomochilus weberi, commonly known as Weber's pipe snake or the Sumatran giant blind snake, is a species of snake in the family Anomochilidae. The species is endemic to Southeast Asia and Oceania.

Etymology
The specific name, weberi, is in honor of German-Dutch zoologist Max Wilhelm Carl Weber van Bosse.

Geographic range
A. weberi is found in Indonesia, where it is known from Sumatra and Borneo, and in Malaysia, where it is known from Sabah.

Habitat

Description
A. weberi has the following scalation: frontal quadrangular, nearly twice as large as the supraocular; no enlarged parietals; four upper labials, third largest and in contact with eye; dorsal scales in 21 rows; ventrals 244, scarcely larger than dorsal scales; anal divided; subcaudals 8. Dorsally, it is brown, with each scale edge lighter. There is a light spot on each prefontal and on the frontal. On each side of the back there is a series of round light spots, in pairs or alternating. Along the middle of each side there is an interrupted whitish line. Ventrally it has irregular light spots arranged in pairs and sometimes confluent.

References

Further reading
Lidth de Jeude TW van (1890). "REPTILIA from the Malay Archipelago. II. Ophidia". pp. 178–192. (Anomalochilus weberi, new species, p. 181 + Plate XV, figures 1–3). (in English). In: Weber M (1890). Zoologische Ergebnisse einer Reise in Niederländisch Ost-Indien. Erster Band [ Volume I ]. Leiden: E.J. Brill. xi + 3 maps + 460 pp. + Plates I-XXV. (in German, French, and English).

Anomochilidae
Reptiles of Indonesia
Endemic fauna of Indonesia
Fauna of Sumatra
Reptiles of Borneo
Reptiles described in 1890